HMS Dolphins Prize was a brig-sloop that was formerly the French privateer La Marquise de Cavalaire, captured by HMS Dolphin on 19 September 1757.

References

1750s ships
Ships of the Royal Navy
Privateer ships of France